Nancy Agabian is an American writer, activist, and teacher, currently lecturing at New York University, Gallatin. She is of Armenian origin, and her memoir about her childhood, Me as Her Again: True Stories of an Armenian Daughter, won Lambda Literary's Jeanne Córdova Prize for Lesbian/Queer Nonfiction.

Career 
Agabian is an Armenian-American writer, who studied at Columbia University's School of the Arts.  In 2000, she published a collection of essays, poetry, and non-fiction pieces titled Princess Freak (Beyond Baroque). In 2008, she published a memoir, titled Me as her again: True Stories of an Armenian Daughter (Aunt Lute Books). The memoir was shortlisted for the Lambda Literary Award for Nonfiction in 2009, was shortlisted for the William Saroyan International Prize, and won the Jeanne Cordova Prize for Lesbian/Queer Non-fiction in 2021. In 2006, she received a Fulbright Fellowship as well as a Lambda Literary Fellowship in 2012, to write about Armenian identity and history. Agabian has written a novel, The Fear of Large and Small Nations (Nauset Press) about the Armenian diaspora, based on her research conducted during her Fulbright Fellowship, which was shortlisted for the 2016 PEN/Bellwether Prize for Socially Engaged Fiction.

Agabian teaches creative writing at The Gallatin School of Individualized Study, New York University, and at The Leslie-Lohman Museum of Gay and Lesbian Art in New York. She has also worked to promote and preserve Armenian writing in America.

Bibliography 

 Me as Her Again (Aunt Lute Books, 2008) 
 Princess Freak: Poems and Performances (Beyond Baroque Books, 2000) 
 (edited) Fierce: Essays by and about Dauntless Women (Nauset Press, 2019) 
 The Fear of Large and Small Nations (Nauset Press, 2022)

Awards and honors

References 

Armenian-American culture in New York City
Armenian-American culture in Massachusetts
Armenian writers
21st-century American women writers
Columbia University School of the Arts alumni
Columbia University faculty
Lambda Literary Award winners
Living people
Year of birth missing (living people)